The Roman Catholic Diocese of Ségou is a diocese located in the city of Ségou in the Ecclesiastical province of Bamako in Mali.

History
 March 10, 1962: Established as Diocese of Ségou from the Metropolitan Archdiocese of Bamako

Bishops
 Bishops of Ségou (Roman rite)
 Archbishop (personal title) Pierre Louis Leclerc, M. Afr. (1962.03.10 – 1974.07.01)
 Bishop Mori Julien-Marie Sidibé (1974.07.01 – 2003.03.25)
 Bishop Augustin Traoré (since 2003.10.30)

Other priests of this diocese who became bishops
Joseph Dao, appointed Bishop of Kayes in 1978
Jean Zerbo, appointed auxiliary bishop of Bamako in 1988; future Cardinal

See also
Roman Catholicism in Mali

References

External links
 GCatholic.org

Ségou
Segou
Christian organizations established in 1962
Roman Catholic dioceses and prelatures established in the 20th century
1962 establishments in Mali
Roman Catholic Ecclesiastical Province of Bamako